This article is about the particular significance of the year 1946 to Wales and its people.

Incumbents
Archbishop of Wales – David Prosser, Bishop of St David's
Archdruid of the National Eisteddfod of Wales – Crwys

Events
12 July – The Coal Industry Nationalisation Act is passed by Parliament.
August
Arthur Horner becomes General Secretary of the National Union of Mineworkers.
Stocks of captured Nazi German bombs filled with Tabun (nerve agent) begin to be transferred from Llanberis to open storage at RAF Llandwrog.
November – The highest ever temperature for this month in the UK is recorded at Prestatyn: 71 °F (21.7 °C).
December – George Isaacs inaugurates the first Remploy factory, in Bridgend, with the aim of offering work to disabled ex-servicemen.
26 December – A serious collapse at Bryn Eglwys slate mine near Abergynolwyn causes its closure.
A pneumoconiosis research unit is established at Llandough Hospital near Cardiff, in recognition of the damage being caused to miners' health.

Arts and literature
In the absence of a Prince of Wales, The Princess Elizabeth, heir presumptive to the throne, is admitted to the Gorsedd.

Awards

National Eisteddfod of Wales (held in Mountain Ash)
National Eisteddfod of Wales: Chair – Geraint Bowen
National Eisteddfod of Wales: Crown – Rhydwen Williams
National Eisteddfod of Wales: Prose Medal – Dafydd Jenkins

New books

In Welsh
Pennar Davies – Cinio'r Cythraul
Albert Evans-Jones (Cynan) – Ffarwel Weledig
Thomas Rowland Hughes – Chwalfa
John Gwilym Jones – Y Goeden Erin

In English
Caradoc Evans – The Earth Gives All and Takes All
Emyr Humphreys – Little Kingdom
Dylan Thomas – Deaths and Entrances
Gwyn Thomas – The Dark Philosophers

Music
15 April – The Welsh National Opera makes its debut, at the Prince of Wales Theatre, Cardiff, with a double bill of Cavalleria rusticana and Pagliacci, with almost all the singers being amateurs.
Daniel Jones – Scenes from the Mabinogion

Film
London Town featuring Tessie O'Shea

Broadcasting
June – The BBC's regional director for Wales tells Welsh MPs that there is "not enough talent... to sustain a full continuous programme".

Sport
Boxing – Wales stages its first-ever world title fight, in which lightweight Ronnie James is defeated by Ike Williams.

Births
10 January – Terry Cobner, rugby player
15 January – Roger Davis, cricketer
31 January – Bobby Windsor, rugby player
20 February – Mike Roberts, Wales and British Lion rugby player
21 March – Timothy Dalton, actor
2 April – Dai Llewellyn, socialite (died 2009)
5 April – Russell Davies, journalist and broadcaster
13 April – Della Jones, mezzo-soprano
19 May – Androw Bennett, writer
6 June – Hywel Francis, politician and historian (died 2021)
14 June – Glyn Berry, diplomat
6 August – Ron Davies, politician
12 August – Andrew McNeillie, poet and literary editor
3 October – Richie Morgan, professional footballer and manager
18 October – Dafydd Elis-Thomas, politician
26 November – Brian Hibbard, actor and singer (died 2012)
27 November – Kim Howells, politician
6 December – Martin Moore-Bick, judge
9 December – Mervyn Davies, rugby player (died 2012)
date unknown – Tony Curtis, poet

Deaths
8 January – Dion Fortune, writer, 55
23 January – William Evans, Wales dual code international rugby player, 62
25 April (in London) – Arthur Jenkins, MP for Pontypool, 64
14 March – Reg Thomas, athlete, 39
16 April – Jack Jenkins, footballer, 54
25 April – Arthur Jenkins, politician, 64
25 May – Ernest Rhys ("Mr Everyman"), writer, 86
1 June – Arthur Griffith-Boscawen, politician, 80
10 June – Humphrey Jones, footballer, 83
18 June – Thomas Llewellyn Jones, businessman and politician in Australia, 74
4 July – Taffy O'Callaghan, footballer, 39
15 July – William Cope, 1st Baron Cope, politician, 75
20 July – Richard Thomas Evans, politician, 55/56
8 August – Miriam Kate Williams ("Vulcana"), strongwoman, 72
12 August – Alfred Augustus Mathews, vicar and Wales international rugby player, 82
25 August – Tudor Edwards, thoracic surgeon, 56
26 August – Ruth Herbert Lewis, social reformer and collector of Welsh folk songs, 74
15 October – David Percy Davies, newspaper editor,
4 November – Bill Morris, Wales international rugby player, 77
5 November – Thomas Scott-Ellis, 8th Baron Howard de Walden, author and patron of the arts in Wales, 66
24 November – Sydney Nicholls, Wales rugby international player, 78
6 December – Charles Butt Stanton MP, politician, 73
date unknown 
William Egan, footballer, 73 or 74
Morris Williams, publisher, husband and collaborator of Kate Roberts
Ianto Davies, rugby player, ?48

See also
1946 in Northern Ireland

References